Nandarkha is a village in the Navsari district  in the Indian state of Gujarat. The population was 3,112 at the 2011 Indian census.

Geography

Climate
The weather is sunny from September to May, rainy from June to August. The average maximum and minimum temperatures are 40 °C (104 °F) and 18 °C (64 °F) respectively.

Transport
Nandarkha lies on the Mumbai-Delhi railway link.

References

Villages in Navsari district